The African Championships in Athletics is a continental athletics event organized by the Confederation of African Athletics (CAA), the continental association for the sport in Africa. Since its inaugural edition in 1979 it was at first organised intermittently with nine editions held in fourteen years until 1993. Following the tenth edition in 1996 it has been organised biennially on even years, and is always held in the same year as the Summer Olympics. The 21st edition was held in Asaba, Nigeria in August 2018.

The event featured a men's marathon from 1979 to 1990. Following it being dropped from the programme an African Marathon Championships was briefly contested. The event programme has roughly matched that of the IAAF World Championships in Athletics, with the exception of the 50 kilometres race walk.

The following list shows changes to the event programme:

1982, women's heptathlon and men's 20 km walk were added to replace women's pentathlon and men's 10 km walk.
1985, women's 10,000 m was added.
1988, women's 5 km walk was added. Discontinued since 1998.
1992, women's triple jump was added. Men's marathon, held from 1979 to 1990 (with the exception of 1984) was permanently dropped.
1996, women's 5000 metres was added.
1998, women's hammer throw was added. Women's 3000 metres was permanently removed from the programme, while men's 3000 metres event was held for the only time.
2000, women's pole vault was added. Women's 10 km walk was also added before being held again in 2002 and discontinued.
2004, women's 3000 m steeplechase and 20 km walk were added.
2022, mixed 4 × 400 metres relay was added.

Championships

Championship records

Statistics

Points Wins by country

All-time medal table (1979–2022)

Most successful athletes
The best athletes of these championships are:

Men  Hakim Toumi 7 gold medals 
Women  Zoubida Laayouni 7 gold medals

References

External links
Confederation of African Athletics

 
Continental athletics championships
Confederation of African Athletics competitions
Recurring sporting events established in 1979
Athletics
Biennial athletics competitions